Gera or Yera is a town on the Aegean island of Lesbos in Greece. It once stood as one of the largest ports of the island. According to scholars the ancient name may have been Portus Hieraeus; Pliny the Elder mentions a Lesbian city called Hiera, which was abandoned before his time.

History 
The 1st-century Roman historian and naturalist Pliny the Elder recorded the existence of an ancient city on Lesbos known as Hiera. Scholars argue that the name is derived from the Greek goddess Hera, and there is evidence that the island of Lesbos followed the cult of Hera during the time of Sappho around the 7th century B.C.

Geography and administration

The Municipality of Gera was established with the Kapodistrias reform in 1997, with the capital at Pappados, covering a surface  of 86.350 km2 (33.340 sq mi) and with a population of 6,101 in the 2011 census. Its largest towns are Skopelos (1,530), Palaiokipos (976), Mesagros (631), Perama (726), Pappados (pop. 1,442). It was again abolished in the 2010 Kallikratis reform. Since the 2019 local government reform, it is part of the municipality Mytilene.

Bay of Gera
The Bay of Gera is a wider area of Lesbos, with the main port today at Perama. The name has changed throughout history, and has been variously called Ieremidia, Gieremia, Geremia, Lichremadia, Maliae, Iero, Hiera, Giera, Keramia, Iera, Gera, Eleon, Olivier.

External links
Official website 
Gera History

Bibliography

References

Populated places in Lesbos